The 2014 United States House of Representatives elections in Massachusetts were held on Tuesday, November 4, 2014 to elect the nine U.S. representatives from the Commonwealth of Massachusetts, one from each of the state's nine congressional districts. The elections coincided with the election of Massachusetts' Class II U.S. Senator and other elections to the United States Senate in other states and elections to the United States House of Representatives and various state and local elections, including the Governor of Massachusetts.

Democratic nominees were victorious in all nine Massachusetts districts in 2014, bringing the Republican losing streak in Bay State U.S. House general and special elections to a state record 101 contests in a row.

Overview
Results of the 2014 United States House of Representatives elections in Massachusetts by district:

District 1

The 1st congressional district is located in western and central Massachusetts. The largest Massachusetts district in area, it covers about one-third of the state and is more rural than the rest. It has the state's highest point, Mount Greylock. The district includes the cities of Springfield, West Springfield, Pittsfield, Holyoke, and Westfield. The incumbent is Democrat Richard Neal, who has represented the district since 2013 and previously represented the 2nd district from 1989 to 2013. He was re-elected unopposed with 98% of the vote in 2012 and the district has a PVI of D+13.

General election

District 2

The 2nd congressional district is located in central Massachusetts. It contains the cities of Worcester, which is the second-largest city in New England after Boston, and Northampton in the Pioneer Valley. The incumbent is Democrat Jim McGovern, who has represented the district since 2013 and previously represented the 3rd district from 1997 to 2013. He was re-elected unopposed with 99% of the vote in 2012 and the district has a PVI of D+8.

Dan Dubrule of Leominster, Massachusetts has announced as a Republican candidate. Due to state ballot law, he will be running as a write-in candidate.

General election

District 3

The 3rd congressional district is located in northeastern and central Massachusetts. It contains the Merrimack valley including Lowell, Lawrence and Haverhill. The incumbent is Democrat Niki Tsongas, who has represented the district since 2013 and previously represented the 5th district from 2007 to 2013. She was re-elected with 66% of the vote in 2012 and the district has a PVI of D+6.

General election

District 4

The 4th congressional district is located mostly in southern Massachusetts. It contains Bristol, Middlesex, Norfolk, Plymouth and Worcester counties. The incumbent is Democrat Joseph P. Kennedy III, who has represented the district since 2013. He was elected with 61% of the vote in 2012 and the district has a PVI of D+6.

General election

District 5

The 5th congressional district is located in eastern Massachusetts. It contains Middlesex, Suffolk and Worcester counties. The incumbent is Democrat Katherine Clark, who has represented the district since 2013. She was elected with 66% of the vote in a special election in 2013 to succeed Ed Markey and the district has a PVI of D+14.

Mike Stopa has announced that he will run as a Republican candidate for this district.

General election

District 6

The 6th congressional district is located in northeastern Massachusetts. It contains most of Essex County, including the North Shore and Cape Ann. The incumbent was Democrat John F. Tierney, who has represented the district since 1997. He was re-elected with 48% of the vote in 2012 and the district has a PVI of D+4.

Democratic primary
Incumbent Democrat John F. Tierney faced a challenge in the Democratic primary from immigration attorney Marisa DeFranco, John Devine, John Gutta and United States Marine Seth Moulton. Democrats who declined to run include Kim Driscoll, the Mayor of Salem, and State Representatives John D. Keenan and Steven Walsh. Moulton defeated Tierney in the primary.

Polling

Results

Republican primary
Republican Richard Tisei, a former member of the Massachusetts Senate and the nominee against Tierney in 2012, ran uncontested in the 2014 Republican primary and ran again as the Republican nominee in the general election.

General election

Polling

Results

District 7

The 7th congressional district is located in eastern Massachusetts. It contains the northern three-quarters of the city of Boston, the city of Somerville and parts of the city of Cambridge. The incumbent is Democrat Mike Capuano, who has represented the district since 2013 and previously represented the 8th district from 1999 to 2013. He was re-elected with 83% of the vote in 2012 and the district has a PVI of D+31.

Capuano considered running for Governor of Massachusetts in the 2014 election, however, he instead chose to run for re-election to the House.

General election

District 8

The 8th congressional district is located in eastern Massachusetts. It contains the southern quarter of the city of Boston and many of its southern suburbs. The incumbent is Democrat Stephen Lynch, who has represented the district since 2013 and previously represented the 9th district from 2001 to 2013. He was re-elected with 76% of the vote in 2012 and the district has a PVI of D+6.

General election

District 9

The 9th congressional district is located in eastern Massachusetts, including Cape Cod and the South Coast. It contains all of Barnstable, Dukes and Nantucket counties and parts of Bristol and Plymouth counties. The incumbent is Democrat Bill Keating, who has represented the district since 2013 and previously represented the 10th district from 2011 to 2013. He was re-elected with 59% of the vote in 2012 and the district has a PVI of D+5.

Biologist Mark Alliegro announced he is challenging the Democratic incumbent William R. Keating.
John Chapman (R) - Ex-State Industrial Accidents Commissioner, Ex-Reagan White House Aide & Attorney
Vincent Cogliano Jr. (R) - Plymouth County GOP Chair Dan Shores (R) - Attorney

General election

Polling

Results

References

External links
U.S. House elections in Massachusetts, 2014 at Ballotpedia
Campaign contributions at OpenSecrets

United States House of Representatives
2014
Massachusetts